Ratjai Sripet (born 23 December 1960) is a Thai sprinter. She competed in the women's 100 metres at the 1992 Summer Olympics.

References

External links
 

1960 births
Living people
Athletes (track and field) at the 1984 Summer Olympics
Athletes (track and field) at the 1992 Summer Olympics
Ratjai Sripet
Ratjai Sripet
Place of birth missing (living people)
Asian Games medalists in athletics (track and field)
Ratjai Sripet
Ratjai Sripet
Athletes (track and field) at the 1986 Asian Games
Athletes (track and field) at the 1990 Asian Games
Medalists at the 1986 Asian Games
Medalists at the 1990 Asian Games
Southeast Asian Games medalists in athletics
Ratjai Sripet
Ratjai Sripet
Competitors at the 1977 Southeast Asian Games
Olympic female sprinters
Ratjai Sripet
Ratjai Sripet